Daniel Spencer Winnik (born March 6, 1985) is a Canadian professional ice hockey winger who is currently playing with Geneve-Servette HC in the National League (NL).

Playing career
After two seasons in the Ontario Provincial Junior A Hockey League (OPJHL) with the Wexford Raiders, Winnik joined the college hockey ranks with the University of New Hampshire of Hockey East. Following his freshman year, Winnik was drafted 265th overall in the 2004 NHL Entry Draft by the Phoenix Coyotes. He found his scoring touch with the Wildcats in his sophomore year, scoring 18 goals for 40 points and was one of UNH's best in being named to the NCAA Northeast Regional All-Tournament team. In his junior year, Daniel consolidated his break-out year by leading the Wildcats with 26 assists and finishing fifth in the Hockey East in scoring with 41 points. He was named as Hockey East player of the month for November and was selected to the Hockey East Second All-Star Team. After completing a three-year career with New Hampshire he signed a three-year entry-level contract with the Coyotes on March 31, 2006. He immediately made his professional debut with American Hockey League (AHL) affiliate, the San Antonio Rampage, to finish the 2005–06 season.

In his first full professional year in 2006–07, Winnik played in a checking role with the Rampage scoring 21 points in 66 games while also spending a stint in the East Coast Hockey League (ECHL) with secondary affiliate, the Phoenix RoadRunners. In 2007–08, Winnik made the Coyotes line-up out of training camp and scored his first NHL goal in his debut on October 4, 2007, in a 3–2 win against the St. Louis Blues. At the end of his first NHL year Winnik had established himself as a regular in the Coyotes team and was looked upon, by coach Wayne Gretzky, as the team's top penalty killer.

After a promising start to his NHL career, Dan suffered a sophomore slump in 2008–09, scoring just 7 points in 49 games. Seldom used as a reserve forward,d he was assigned to San Antonio on a 5-game conditioning stint on January 1, 2009. He was then re-signed to an arbitrated one-year contract on July 24, 2009. Winnik quickly rebounded in the following 2009–10 season, regaining a checking line role and finding his scoring touch, tying his career high with 15 assists. As part of a resurgent Coyotes team he made his playoff debut appearing scoreless in 7 games against the Detroit Red Wings.

On June 28, 2010, Winnik was traded by the Coyotes to the Colorado Avalanche for a fourth-round pick in the 2012 NHL Entry Draft. He was then signed to a two-year contract with the Avalanche on July 2, 2010.

In the 2011–12 season, at the trade deadline on February 27, 2012, Winnik was traded by the Avalanche, along with TJ Galiardi and a seventh-round pick, to the San Jose Sharks in exchange for Jamie McGinn and prospects Mike Connolly and Michael Sgarbossa. Unable to agree to terms with the Sharks on a new contract, Winnik was signed as a free agent to a two-year deal with division rivals, the Anaheim Ducks on July 20, 2012.

On July 28, 2014, Winnik signed as a free agent to a one-year contract with his hometown team, the Toronto Maple Leafs, worth $1.3 million. In the 2014–15 season, Winnik proved a versatile asset for the Maple Leafs with his penalty killing abilities and scoring touch, notching 25 points in 58 appearances, and having spent time on all four lines. On February 25, 2015, with the Maple Leafs out of playoff contention, he was traded to the Pittsburgh Penguins in exchange for Zach Sill, a 2015 fourth-round pick and a 2016 second-round pick. In 21 games with the Penguins, Winnik collected 2 goals and 9 points but was unable to help the Penguins to a deep playoff run.

On July 1, 2015, Winnik, by this time a fan favourite in Toronto, returned to the Maple Leafs, signing as a free agent on a two-year deal. Winnik's offensive production declined from his previous season with the Maple Leafs, though he remained a concrete part of the penalty kill. On February 28, 2016, the eve of the trade deadline, Winnik was traded to the Washington Capitals, along with a 5th-round selection (Beck Malenstyn) in the 2016 draft, in exchange for forward Brooks Laich, prospect defenceman Connor Carrick and a 2nd round draft pick in 2016 (Carl Grundström).

After collecting a career-best 12 goals and contributing with 25 points in 72 games for the Presidents' Trophy-winning Capitals in the 2016–17 season, Winnik became a free agent at the conclusion of his contract. Going un-signed over the summer, Winnik accepted an invitation to attend the Minnesota Wild's 2017 training camp on a professional try-out contract (PTO). On the opening day of the 2017–18 season, Winnik secured a one-year deal with the Wild on October 4, 2017.

Prior to the 2018–19 season, Winnik signed a PTO with the Boston Bruins. After attending training camp and remaining on the roster through the pre-season, Winnik was belatedly released from his PTO contract and signed abroad with Geneve-Servette HC of the Swiss National League on October 1, 2018. On February 7, 2019, Winnik agreed to an early two-year contract extension worth CHF 1.4 million with Geneva, through the 2020–21 season. On April 6, 2021, Winnik agreed to an early one-year contract extension with Servette through the 2021–22 season. The contract also includes an option for the 2022–23 season. On February 8, 2022, Winnik agreed to an early two-year contract extension with Servette through the 2023/24 season.

International play
In January 2022, Winnik was selected to play for Team Canada at the 2022 Winter Olympics.

Career statistics

Regular season and playoffs

International

Awards and honours

References

External links
 

1985 births
Living people
Anaheim Ducks players
Arizona Coyotes draft picks
Canadian ice hockey left wingers
Colorado Avalanche players
Genève-Servette HC players
Minnesota Wild players
New Hampshire Wildcats men's ice hockey players
Ontario Junior Hockey League players
Phoenix Coyotes players
Phoenix RoadRunners players
Pittsburgh Penguins players
San Antonio Rampage players
San Jose Sharks players
Ice hockey people from Toronto
Toronto Maple Leafs players
Washington Capitals players
Canadian expatriate ice hockey players in Switzerland
Ice hockey players at the 2022 Winter Olympics
Olympic ice hockey players of Canada